Amy May Hutchinson  (née Scott, 2 July 1888 – 11 June 1985) was a New Zealand maternity reformer. She was born in London, England, on 2 July 1888.

In the 1948 King's Birthday Honours, Hutchinson was appointed a Member of the Order of the British Empire in recognition of her role as secretary of the Auckland branch of the Society for the Protection of Women and Children.

References

1888 births
1985 deaths
New Zealand activists
New Zealand women activists
New Zealand social workers
British emigrants to New Zealand
New Zealand Members of the Order of the British Empire